Nemanja Arnautović (born 14 March 1990) is a Serbian professional basketball player.

Professional career 
Arnautović played for Hemofarm, Mega Basket, Budućnost, Crvena zvezda, Sloboda Užice, Klik, and Crnokosa.

National team career 
In August 2006, Arnautović was a member of the Serbia and Montenegro U16 national team that won a bronze medal at the FIBA Europe Under-16 Championship in Spain. Over seven tournament games, he averaged 0.9 points and 0.1 rebounds per game.

In July 2010, Arnautović was a member of the Serbia U-20 national team at the FIBA Europe Under-20 Championship in Croatia. Over nine tournament games, he averaged 3.3 points and 0.6 rebounds per game. Thereafter, he represented the Serbia at the 2013 Mediterranean Games, with whom he won the silver medal.

References

External links
 Nemanja Arnautovic at realgm.com
 Nemanja Arnautovic at eurobasket.com
 Nemanja Arnautovic at basketball-reference.com
 Nemanja Arnautovic at euroleague.net

1990 births
Living people
ABA League players
Basketball League of Serbia players
KK Budućnost players
KK Crvena zvezda players
KK Crnokosa players
KK Hemofarm players
KK Klik Arilje players
KK Mega Basket players
KK Sloboda Užice players
Serbian expatriate basketball people in Montenegro
Serbian men's basketball players
Shooting guards
Sportspeople from Užice
Mediterranean Games silver medalists for Serbia
Mediterranean Games medalists in basketball
Competitors at the 2013 Mediterranean Games